Fausat Balogun (also known as Madam Saje, born 13 February 1959) is a Nigerian actress who stars majorly in Yoruba movies. She starred as Mama Saje in a 1990 television series titled Erin Kee Kee. Fausat has starred in over 80 movies.

Balogun is married to the actor Rafiu Balogun. He was her boss before they married. She hails from Oke Ode Ifelodun Local Government Area, Kwara State. By the time she was famous her children were adults. Her eldest son is a director, and her youngest daughter is an actress.

Selected filmography 

Oyelaja
Owo Onibara
Okan Mi
Akebaje
Ladigbolu
Morenike
Oko Mama E
Tanimola
Nkan Okunkun
Adufe
Leyin Akponle
Laba Laba
Itelorun
Omo Elemosho
Iyawo Ojokan
Ife Kobami
Gbogbo Lomo
Asepamo
Eto Obinrin
Iyawo Elenu Razor
Kokoro Ate
Omoge Elepa
Olaitan Anikura
Oju Elegba
Langbodo
Ologo Nla
Abgara Obinrin
Eepo
Moriyeba
Orisirisi (Kose Gbo)
Serekode
Ojo Ikunle
Alase Aye
Imported Lomo
Adun Ale
Ileri Oluwa
Ogbun Aye
Omo Pupa
Òmìn
O Ti Poju
Olowo Laye Mo
Irenimoyan
Alaimore
Olasunkanmi
''Salawa"
"Adebimpe omo oba"
" Alaroka
"Oro itan
" Ebi Dapo
" Aromire
" Awele
"Oro idile
" Ogbon

Recognitions
During the 2016 edition of the City People Entertainment Awards, she was bestowed a Special Recognition Award for her "remarkable contributions to the growth of the movie industry in Nigeria".

See also
List of Nigerian actors

References

External links

1959 births
Living people
Yoruba actresses
Actresses from Kwara State
Actresses in Yoruba cinema
20th-century Nigerian actresses
21st-century Nigerian actresses
Nigerian television actresses
Nigerian film actresses
People from Kwara State